Markus Imhoof (born 19 September 1941) is a Swiss film director, screenwriter, theatre and opera director.

Biography

He began his career as a documentary maker, focusing on controversial issues. His 1968 film Rondo was a critical look at the prison system in Switzerland. The film was banned until 1975. His next picture, Ormenis 199+69 (1969) also met with censorship, as it examined the role and treatment of horses in the cavalry and suggested that the unit ought to be disbanded. Imhoof was forced to make some edits before the film could be screened in public, removing scenes that military veterans found objectionable. Only in 2002 did the film became available in uncensored form. Volksmund - oder man ist was man isst (Vernacular - One Is What One Eats) (1972) was a documentary critical of consumption in society.

Later in his career Imhoof began directing regular narrative films as well. His film Das Boot ist voll (The Boat Is Full) (1980) received international acclaim for showing the downside of Switzerland's neutral politics during World War II. The film depicted a group of Jewish refugees in 1942 being forced to return to Nazi Germany on order of the Swiss government and thus meeting their deaths in the concentration camps. At the time it was the first Swiss film to deal with this controversial topic. Imhoof's next film, Die Reise (The Journey) (1986) examined Baader-Meinhof's terrorism. Der Berg (The Mountain) (1990) was a psychological study of three people stranded on top of a mountain with only enough food for two of them to survive. Flammen im Paradies (Fire in Paradise) (1997) is also a psychological study, this time depicting a young woman promised in marriage who switches places with a woman bound for India.

Theatre

 Rise and Fall of the City of Mahagonny (Aufstieg und Fall der Stadt Mahagonny 1987)
 The Servant (Il Servo 1987)
 The Longing of the Masks (Sehnsucht der Masken 1988)
 Tales from the Vienna Woods (Geschichten aus dem Wiener Wald 1989)
 Lulu (1992)
 Hamlet (1993)
 Falstaff (1993)
 The Mastersingers of Nuremberg (Die Meistersinger von Nürnberg 1996)
 The Seagull (Die Möwe 1998)
 Così fan tutte (1998)
 Lucia di Lammermoor (1999)
 Nathan the Wise Lessings Traum von Nathan dem Weisen (2000)
 The Abduction from the Seraglio Die Entführung aus dem Serail (2002)
 Richard II (2002)

Film

As writer/director

 Woe if We Let Go (Wehe, wenn wir losgelassen 1961) (short film)
 Princess Tuamasi (Prinzessin Tuamasi 1962) (short puppet film)
 Happy Birthday (1968) (short film)
 Rondo (1968 film) (1968) (short documentary)
 Ormenis 199+69 (1969) (short documentary)
 Swiss Painters and Sculptors (Schweizer Maler und Bildern CH TV and Pro Helvetia 1970)
 You Are What You Eat (Volksmund – oder man ist, was man isst 1972) (documentary)
 Escape Risk (Fluchtgefahr 1974)
 Thaw (Tauwetter 1977)
 Pipe Polishers (Isewixer TV 1979)
 The Boat Is Full (Das Boot is voll 1981)
 Via Scarlatti 20 (1982)
 The Journey (Die Reise 1986) (adapted from Bernward Vesper's autobiography)
 Little Illusions (Les petites Illusions 1991)
 Fire in Paradise (Flammen im Paradies / Les Raisons du Coeur 1996)
 More than Honey (2012)
 Eldorado (2018)

As co-author

 The Mountain (Der Berg 1990) (co-author Thomas Hürlimann)
 Angry Kisses (Zornige Küsse 1999) (co-author and director Judith Kennel)

Awards and nominations

 Zurich Film Award for Ormenis 199 † 69 (1971)
 International Venice Film Festival Silver Medal for Ormenis 199 † 69 (1971)
 Zurich Film Award for You Are What You Eat (1972)
 Zurich Film Award for Absconding (1975)
 Prix Italia for Pipe Polishers (1979)
 Berlin International Film Festival Silver Bear for The Boat is Full (1981)
 Berlin International Film Festival Otto-Dibelius-Prize for The Boat is Full (1981) 
 Berlin International Film Festival OCIC-Prize for The Boat is Full (1981)
 Berlin International Film Festival CIDALC-Prize for The Boat is Full (1981)
 Oscar Nomination, Best Foreign Language Film, for The Boat is Full (1981)
 Prix-Aliza, Paris, for The Boat is Full (1981)
 David di Donatello (René Clair Award) Rome, for The Boat is Full (1982)

Awards and nominations for More than Honey 2012/13

Switzerland

 Swiss Film Award for Best Documentary
 Swiss Film Award for Best Film Score
 Zurich Film Award for Best Documentary Film (2012)                                             
 Prix Walo for Best Film Production
 Solothurner Film Festival, Audience Award 
 Delémont-Hollywood, Audience Award

Germany

 German Film Award LOLA for Best Documentary 
 German Film Award LOLA for Best Editing (nominated)
 Bavarian Film Award for Best Documentary 
 Leipzig Movie Fair, Guild Film Award for Best Documentary
 Darsser Nature Film Festival, Best Film: Man and Nature 
 Darsser Nature Film Festival, Audience Award
 Green Screen film festival, Special Jury Award

Austria
 ROMY Film Award, Best Director, Documentary
 ROMY Film Award for Best Theatrical Documentary
 Austrian Film Award for Best Sound Design

United States
 Santa Barbara International Film Festival, Best Documentary
 Green Film Festival San Francisco, Best Feature Film Award

France
 Festival Pariscience – International Festival of Scientific Film, Buffon Prize
 Bourges International Ecological Film Festival, Best Documentary

Italy
 Gran Paradiso Film Festival, Premio Parco Nazionale Gran Paradiso

Great Britain
 UK Green Film Festival, Audience Award

Romania
 Pelicam International Film Festival, Audience Award

Ukraine
 Apimondia - International Apicultural Congress, Golden Medal World Beekeeping Awards

Brazil
 Filmambiente International Environmental Film Festival, Special Mention

Bibliography

 Markus Imhoof: Das Boot ist voll. Ein Filmbuch. Ammann, Zurich 1983.
 Markus Imhoof and :
 Vom Leben und Überleben der Bienen. orange-press, Freiburg 2012, .
 More Than Honey: The Survival of Bees and the Future of Our World, Greystone Books, 2015, .

Sources

External links

Official Website

Markus Imhoof interviewed on "The Organic View" Radio Show
*
*

Swiss film directors
Swiss screenwriters
Male screenwriters
1941 births
Living people
German-language film directors
Members of the Academy of Arts, Berlin
Zurich University of the Arts alumni